Nowjeh Deh or Nujeh Deh, also rendered as Navadeh, may refer to various places in Iran:
 Nowjeh Deh, Ardabil
 Nujeh Deh, Heris, East Azerbaijan Province
 Nowjeh Deh, Shabestar, East Azerbaijan Province
 Nowjeh Deh, Tabriz, East Azerbaijan Province
 Nowjeh Deh Daraq, East Azerbaijan Province
 Nowjeh Deh-e Sadat, East Azerbaijan Province
 Nowjeh Deh-e Sheykhlar, East Azerbaijan Province
 Nujeh Deh-e Kuh, East Azerbaijan Province
 Nowjeh Deh-e Olya, East Azerbaijan Province
 Nowjeh Deh-ye Sofla, East Azerbaijan Province